Clear Lake is a lake in Meeker County, in the U.S. state of Minnesota.

Clear Lake was named on account of its clear water. Clear Lake is 529 acres and reaches a maximum depth of 18 feet and average 10 feet in depth. The lake generally has cloudy water, which averages around 2 feet in clarity. Eurasian watermilfoil was found in Clear Lake in 2013. Clear Lake is known for its large bullhead and panfish populations and is heavily fished for walleye.

See also
List of lakes in Minnesota

References

Lakes of Minnesota
Lakes of Meeker County, Minnesota